Ernst Hermann Wilhelm Molden (30 May 1886, Vienna, Austria - 11 August 1953, Vienna) was an Austrian journalist and historian.  An editor-in-chief of the Neue Freie Presse before WW2, he founded the Austrian daily newspaper Die Presse in 1946.

Ernst Molden was married to Paula von Preradović, a Serbian and Austrian poet who, in 1947, composed the lyrics for the national anthem of Austria. Their sons Otto and Fritz Molden participated in the Austrian resistance.

References

1886 births
1953 deaths
20th-century Austrian historians
Writers from Vienna
20th-century Austrian journalists
Die Presse editors